Kasak may refer to:

 Kasak (1992 film)
 Kasak (2005 film), a film released in India in 2005
 Kasak, Bulgaria, a village in Dospat Municipality, Smolyan Province, Bulgaria
 Kasak, Iran, a village in Fars Province, Iran
 Kasak (TV series), 2020 Pakistani television drama series produced by Six Sigma Plus for ARY Digital